Eochy (died 904) was the Irish Archdeacon of Duleek until his death in the late 12th century.

References 

904 deaths
10th-century Irish priests
Archdeacons of Duleek